Tetrairidium dodecacarbonyl is the chemical compound with the formula Ir4(CO)12.  This tetrahedral cluster is the most common and most stable "binary" carbonyl of iridium. This air-stable species is only poorly soluble in organic solvents.
It has been used to prepare bimetallic clusters and catalysts, e.g. for the water gas shift reaction, and reforming, but these studies are of purely academic interest.

Structure
Each Ir center is octahedral, being bonded to 3 other iridium atoms and three terminal CO ligands.  Ir4(CO)12 has Td symmetry with an average Ir-Ir distances of 2.693 Å.  The related clusters Rh4(CO)12 and Co4(CO)12 have C3v symmetry because of the presence of three bridging CO ligands in each.

Preparation
It is prepared in two steps by reductive carbonylation of hydrated iridium trichloride.  The first step gives [Ir(CO)2Cl2]−.
IrCl3  +  3 CO +  H2O   →  [Ir(CO)2Cl2]−  +  CO2  +  2 H+ +  Cl−  
4 [Ir(CO)2Cl2]−  +  6 CO + 2 H2O  →  Ir4(CO)12  +  2 CO2  +  4 H+  +  8 Cl−

References

Carbonyl complexes
Organoiridium compounds